IDEA1 is a Wireless Sensor Network simulator, more precisely a node simulator including network models.

It is based on SystemC language, and on SCNSL alpha library. That library was a starting point, and it has been deeply modified and improved.
IDEA1 is composed of accurate models for each of the nodes hardware devices : sensor, microcontroller, radio-frequency transceiver and energy module.

Network Simulator NS-2 is used in the same research field, but for higher level validations (protocols, routing ...). NS-2 is more focused on these high levels, whereas IDEA1 has more hardware (PHY) details, for example accurate power and latency.

Indeed, IDEA1 is composed of measurement-validated models (in hardware) that include Electrical Power, Energy and delays for several hardware devices (3 sensors, 2 microcontrollers, 3 radio-frequency devices). Models are based on Finite State Machines that include timing (for processing, communications...) and electrical consumption.

It has been developed for 433 MHz and 2.4 GHz (IEEE 802.15.4) radio-frequency devices, but will be extended for multimedia applications.

These low-level models are used to simulate Wireless Sensor Networks at high (network) level. It permits to explore design space in order to best choose hardware devices and IEEE 802.15.4 mode.

IDEA1 is currently developed at the Lyon Institute of Nanotechnology (INL), France.

References

External links 

Computer network analysis